Gomer Township is one of twelve townships in Caldwell County, Missouri, and is part of the Kansas City metropolitan area with the USA.  As of the 2000 census, its population was 298.

Gomer Township was established in 1869, and named after Gomer, an old variant name of Nettleton.

Geography

References

External links
 US-Counties.com
 City-Data.com

Townships in Caldwell County, Missouri
Townships in Missouri
1869 establishments in Missouri